Atlético Lagunero was a Mexican football club that played in the Liga Premier - Serie B. The club was based in Ciudad Lerdo, Durango.

Players

Current squad

See also
Football in Mexico

External links
http://www.segundadivisionfmf.org.mx/equipo.asp?ID=104

Football clubs in Durango
Association football clubs established in 2008